Dhumnagiar is a village in West Champaran district in the Indian state of Bihar.

Demographics
As of 2011 India census, Dhumnagiar had a population of 5288 in 949 households. Males constitute 52.49% of the population and females 47.5%. Dhumnagiar has an average literacy rate of 43.75%, lower than the national average of 74%: male literacy is 62.1%, and female literacy is 37.8%. In Dhumnagiar, 21% of the population is under 6 years of age.

References

Villages in West Champaran district